The 1897 Gallaudet Bison football team represented  Gallaudet University, a college for deaf-mutes, as a member of the Maryland Intercollegiate Football Association (MIFA) during the 1897 college football season. The Gallaudet compiled an overall record of 4–1–1 with a mark of 3–0–1, winning the MIFA title.

Schedule

References

Gallaudet
Gallaudet Bison football seasons
Maryland Intercollegiate Football Association football champion seasons
Gallaudet Bison football